Endre Czeizel (3 April 1935 – 10 August 2015) was a Hungarian physician, geneticist, public health administrator, and professor. He was a physician who graduated from Semmelweis University. He was known for discovering that vitamin B9 or folic acid prevents or reduces the formation of more serious developmental disorders, such as neural tube defects like spina bifida. He issued some of his English-language publications under the name Andrew E. Czeizel. He was the Hungarian Director of United Nations World Health Organization (1984-?). From 1996 thru 1998 he was the Director-General of the Hungarian National Institutes of Health. He died from leukemia following a successful bone marrow transplant after approximately one year.

Personal life
In 1958, he married Judit Gerőfi, by whom he fathered two sons, Gábor and Balázs, and a daughter, Barbara. After 12 years of marriage Judit died; he later remarried to Erzsébet Mécs, whose daughter Andrea he raised.  By his mistress Dóra, he fathered two illegitimate children, András and Fanni. Czeizel's son-in law is Gábor Fodor, the leader of the Hungarian Liberal Party.

Awards 
Markusovszky Prize (1970, 1973) 
SZOT Prize (1977)
The Hungarian Republic, Officer's Cross of the Order of Merit (1995)
Kennedy Award (2000)
The Hungarian Cross of the Order of Merit (2005)

References 

1935 births
2015 deaths
Hungarian gynaecologists
Hungarian geneticists
Hungarian Roman Catholics
Hungarian obstetricians
Physicians from Budapest
Deaths from leukemia
Deaths from cancer in Hungary